Louis Edward Sissman (January 1, 1928 Detroit – March 10, 1976)  was a poet and advertising executive.

Biography
Sissman was raised in Detroit.  He went to private schools, and in 1941 he became a national spelling champion when he won the 17th Scripps National Spelling Bee. He was a Quiz Kid.

Near the end of World War II Sissman entered Harvard. He was expelled but returned, graduating in 1949 as Class Poet.

In the 1950s he worked at Prentice-Hall as a copyeditor in New York City. In the 1960s he worked at odd jobs, including campaigning for John F. Kennedy.  Eventually, he was hired by Quinn and Johnson Advertising, in Boston, and he rose to the position of Creative Vice President.  He married Anne, and lived in Still River.

In 1965, he discovered he had Hodgkin’s lymphoma. He fought the disease for a decade.  He wrote book reviews and poems for The New Yorker, monthly columns for The Atlantic, and was published in Harper's Magazine.

His papers are housed at Harvard University.

Awards
 Guggenheim Fellowship, 1968
 Garrison Prize
 Golden Rose Award
 Hello Darkness, won the 1978 National Book Critics Circle Award

Works

Poetry books

Reviews

References

External links
 "L. E. Sissman", Poets of Cambridge U.S.A
 "L. E. Sissman", Worcester Area Writers

1928 births
1976 deaths
20th-century American poets
Harvard University alumni
Writers from Detroit
American male poets
Poets from Michigan
American spellers
Spelling bee champions
The New Yorker critics
The Atlantic (magazine) people
20th-century American male writers